Above and Beyond may refer to:

Film
Above and Beyond (1952 film), a 1952 film about World War II American pilot Paul Tibbets and the atomic bombing of Hiroshima
Above and Beyond (2014 film), a 2014 film about World War II veteran pilots who defended the nascent state of Israel in 1948

Music
Above & Beyond (band), an English trance music group formed in 2000
Above & Beyond (album), a 1999 live album by jazz musician Freddie Hubbard
"Above and Beyond" (song), a 1960 country music song written by Harlan Howard

Other
Above and Beyond (miniseries), a 2006 Canadian mini series about World War II Atlantic ferry operations
above&beyond (magazine), a Canadian magazine
Above & Beyond Children's Museum, Sheboygan, Wisconsin
Above and Beyond Party, UK political party established in 2015

See also
Space: Above and Beyond, 1990s science-fiction television series
Above and Beyoncé: Video Collection & Dance Mixes, a remix and video album by R&B singer Beyoncé Knowles
Medal of Honor: Above and Beyond, a 2020 video game